Şahlıq (also, Shakhlyk) is a village and municipality in the Ujar Rayon of Azerbaijan.  It has a population of 1,038.

References 

Populated places in Ujar District